The Taipei Water Park is a water park in Zhongzheng District, Taipei, Taiwan.

History
Since 2000, the Taipei Water Department had repaired and restored Taipei Pumping Room and set up the Museum of Drinking Water for the public. The first phase work completed in 2002, combined with part of space of Gongguan Water Treatment Plant and renamed it as Taipei Water Park.

On 27 July 2016, a fire broke out at the park, prompting the evacuation of the 1,200 visitors. The fire started from a solar panel grid.

Transportation
The museum is accessible within walking distance south West from Gongguan Station of the Taipei Metro.

See also
 List of parks in Taiwan
 List of tourist attractions in Taiwan

References

External links

 

2002 establishments in Taiwan
Amusement parks opened in 2002
Buildings and structures in Taipei
Tourist attractions in Taipei
Water parks in Taiwan